Caprice is a 1967 DeLuxe Color comedy-thriller film directed by Frank Tashlin starring Doris Day and Richard Harris. It was Day's second and last film with Tashlin, after the previous year's The Glass Bottom Boat. This film and In Like Flint (1967) were the last movies made in CinemaScope, with most studios moving to Panavision and other widescreen processes.

Plot

Patricia Foster (Doris Day), an industrial designer for Femina Cosmetics, owned by Sir Jason Fox (Edward Mulhare), is caught trying to sell a secret Femina cosmetics formula to a rival company, May Fortune, owned by Matthew Cutter (Jack Kruschen). After her arrest, her subsequent release, and her firing from Femina, Patricia is hired by Cutter, but she states she will not divulge any of Femina's other secrets as part of this employment. However, this selling of secrets was a scheme devised by Sir Jason for Patricia to steal a secret formula for a new water-repellent hairspray from Cutter, the formula invented by Dr Stuart Clancy (Ray Walston), May Fortune's head chemist.

Patricia is wooed by Cutter's right-hand man, Christopher White (Richard Harris), who drugs her with truth serum to get her to divulge Femina's other secrets to him. Patricia, however, was aware of what Christopher was trying to do; she only pretended to be drugged and passed along false information.

While she cannot get the formula from Cutter or Clancy, Patricia learns that the formula can be obtained through analysis of a lock of hair from the one person known to have used the hairspray, Clancy's secretary, Su Ling (Irene Tsu). As Patricia goes to work trying to cut off a lock of Su Ling's hair, Christopher spots her. Patricia is unable to get a lock of hair, but Christopher tells her that he too is truly working for Sir Jason, and has the proof to back up his claim.

Later, Christopher is seen setting up surveillance, which includes speaking to Cutter via hidden microphone, Cutter stating that it will be good to see an undercover agent of Sir Jason's caught red-handed trying to steal his formula. Patricia sees what Christopher is doing, although she is assured by Sir Jason that Christopher indeed does work for him and not Cutter. Patricia still does not trust Christopher. She does whatever she can to thwart the surveillance that Christopher has set up, much to Christopher's and Cutter's chagrin.

At a date with one of his regulars named Miranda (Lisa Seagram) – a May Fortune model who Patricia earlier seemed to recognize – Christopher learns that Patricia Foster is not the real name of the woman whom May Fortune has just hired.

At The Times newspaper archives, Christopher is looking through old clippings of a story concerning a man named Robert Fowler being murdered in the Swiss Alps while skiing.

At Su's apartment, Patricia finds her unconscious on the floor, seemingly drugged. She takes a small sample of a black powder lying on the coffee table, which she believes was used to drug Su and which she later gives to Sir Jason to have analyzed for her. Patricia finds a bottle of the hairspray, which she takes with her. Christopher catches her, blackmailing her that he will tell Sir Jason that her real name is Felippa Fowler. Dr Clancy arrives, but Patricia and Christopher manage to escape him and the police without being seen.

At a later rendezvous, Patricia admits to Christopher that her real name is indeed Felippa Fowler, and that her father – the man featured in the news clipping – was murdered in Switzerland while on the trail of a narcotics ring. Before his death, he had divulged that the head of the narcotics ring was discovered to be a woman, most probably the person who killed him. Although finding her father's killer is her main objective, Patricia is still devoted to Sir Jason, to whom she plans to give the bottle of hairspray. Purposely breaking the bottle upon hearing this news – but noticing that the bottle is an expensive Swiss one not used by Cutter – Christopher in turn tells Patricia that Clancy has Swiss connections – that he is married to a Swiss woman still living in Switzerland.

Patricia goes to Switzerland and finds a woman named Madame Piasco (Lilia Skala) – Clancy's mother-in-law – who is the actual cosmetics expert who had long ago come up with the formula for herself to protect her hair for skiing. She gives a bottle to Patricia for free, as Madame Piasco states that May Fortune now has the distribution rights and it will soon be on the market in America.

Patricia goes skiing on the same hill where her father was killed, and comes under fire from a masked skier. She is rescued by Christopher, who arrives in a helicopter in the nick of time. Patricia believes it is Clancy who tried to kill her, while Christopher thinks it could not be him. He seems unconcerned about the news about the hairspray or Clancy's mother-in-law, which makes Patricia realize that neither Christopher nor Sir Jason was ever after the hairspray. Christopher tells her the story: Clancy used to be the chief cosmetics chemist for Sir Jason, but was an utter failure at it, and Sir Jason's true goal was to discover and hire the true chemical mastermind behind Clancy, whose identity he still does not know. Regardless, Patricia plans to give the hairspray solely to Sir Jason, which was her agreed mission. Christopher and Patricia profess their love for each other, but Christopher requests one more job from her concerning Sir Jason.

Out in the middle of a snowy mountaintop, Christopher has secretly placed a microphone on Patricia and secretly films her while she goes to speak to Clancy off in the distance. She offers Clancy a job with Femina as head chemist, with an illegal under-the-table bonus. Clancy declines as he says that Cutter already knows about Madame Piasco, and if Cutter does not care, he is happy where he is. Cut to Cutter's office where he is watching the film that Christopher took of Clancy's and Patricia's encounter. He tells Christopher that this footage, which he plans to broadcast, will ruin Sir Jason forever. But Cutter is angry that Christopher has not kept Patricia under confinement for her illegal role in the matter; he in return states that they can nab Patricia as she leaves Sir Jason's.

Patricia is visiting with Sir Jason, who tells her that he was able to convince Madame Piasco to come and work for him, which Patricia finds incredible. Sir Jason also tells her about the analysis of the black powder, which contains a powerful narcotic. Patricia in turn tells him that she already had the powder analyzed herself, and this analysis conducted by Sir Jason was a test purely to see if he would tell the truth or a lie, the latter of which would implicate him in her father's murder. Sir Jason also tells her that Christopher had her encounter with Clancy filmed, that Cutter plans to broadcast it to the world to ruin him, and that the Paris police after being shown the film, are now after her for bribery. He states that Christopher's motivation is purely financial, as he collects from both sides. Patricia is heartbroken about this news concerning Christopher.

As the police are ready to arrest Patricia outside Sir Jason's apartment, Christopher snatches her away. He admits that he works for Interpol. Later, Patricia is able to tell Christopher's Interpol colleagues that the narcotics were smuggled as May Fortune face powder, which was perfectly harmless until incinerated, but then turned into a powerful hallucinogen. None of them believes that Cutter is smart enough to be the head of the narcotics ring.
 
Donning a microphone to Interpol while searching through Cutter's Paris office, Patricia tries to tell the cleaning lady who enters the office she need not clean here. The cleaning lady is revealed to be Clancy in disguise, with a gun – he being the mysterious woman killer. As Patricia and Clancy move through the building, they scuffle, a gunshot is heard; Clancy is shot, and tumbles over the railing to his death several stories below. Sir Jason, the co-conspirator of the narcotics ring, arrives wielding a gun against Patricia. With Clancy dead, Sir Jason will have the cosmetics market all to himself. Sir Jason manages to force Patricia into a helicopter and take off. Christopher shoots and kills him from a distance, leaving a frightened Patricia alone in the air. She manages to fly the helicopter back to Paris and land it atop the Eiffel Tower.

Patricia and Christopher live happily ever after.

Cast
 Doris Day as Patricia Foster
 Richard Harris as Christopher White
 Ray Walston as Dr. Stuart Clancy
 Edward Mulhare as Sir Jason Fox
 Jack Kruschen as Matthew Cutter
 Lilia Skala as Madame Piasco
 Michael J. Pollard as Barney
 Irene Tsu as Su Ling
 Lisa Seagram as Mandy

Arthur Godfrey, who played the father of Doris Day in Tashlin's previous comedy, The Glass Bottom Boat, plays her father once again but is only seen in a photograph.

Production
In February 1966 John Cohn, who co wrote the film, was announced as producer. Filming started in May.

Reception

Box office
The 20th Century Fox release was a box office bomb, failing to place in the top 20 movies for 1967. According to Fox records, the film needed to earn $7,200,000 in rentals to break even and made $4,580,000, meaning it lost money.

Critical
Film critic Leonard Maltin’s review of the film was quite negative. He gave the film zero stars and said the film was a “terrible vehicle for Doris.” In The New York Times, Bosley Crowther called the film "a jumble of wacky and feeble comedy." Roger Ebert was more amused, writing that "When everything has been said and done, you really have to stand back and admire the sheer professional competence of the people who make Doris Day movies ... If her movies never go anywhere, at least they don't take all day about it. They're directed with a light touch, skillfully edited, and get it over with in no time."

In her memoir, Day recounts an argument she had with her manager-husband Martin Melcher over the script for Caprice, unaware he had signed her name to the contracts before she had the chance to say no. On the DVD commentary, authors Pierre Patrick and John Cork discuss the ways the screenplay was rewritten, ostensibly to please the star. They speculated that recent interest in Tashlin's signature mixture of slapstick, satire, and adventure—coupled with its Mod design—has acquired renewed respect from film buffs and, possibly, from Day herself. Several writers have commented on the "meta" moment in which Doris Day "dashes into a movie theater, where the movie Caprice is playing."

Music
The title theme sung by Doris Day was released as the flip-side to her final single release on the Columbia Records label, the A-side being a more uptempo number, "Sorry."

Adaptations
The screenplay by Jay Jayson and Tashlin was novelized by Julia Withers and was published in paperback by Dell in February, 1967.

Home media
Initially only released on VHS in the UK, the movie was eventually released in a deluxe edition Region 1 DVD in January 2007 in widescreen and includes several extra features.

See also
 List of American films of 1967

References

External links
 
 
 
 
 

1967 films
1967 comedy films
1960s comedy mystery films
1960s comedy thriller films
1960s heist films
1960s mystery thriller films
1960s spy comedy films
20th Century Fox films
CinemaScope films
American comedy mystery films
American comedy thriller films
American heist films
American mystery thriller films
American spy comedy films
1960s English-language films
Films directed by Frank Tashlin
Films scored by Frank De Vol
Films set in Paris
Films set in Switzerland
Films with screenplays by Frank Tashlin
1960s American films